Alfred McAdams (November 1, 1914 – May 17, 2008 ) is an American painter.

McAdams was born in Louisville, Kentucky in 1914. Originally, he planned on becoming an architect, getting his bachelor's in architecture from George Washington University. He also studied at the Chicago Art Institute and the Royal Academy in Stockholm. During the Great Depression, he worked as an editorial assistant with the Federal Writer's Project and taught drafting in the National Youth Administration. For the duration of World War II, he worked as a draftsman with the Engineers at Trinidad, the British West Indies and Baltimore and as part of the Signal Corps in Europe. Gradually during this period, McAdams became more interested in painting, so he began taking night classes at the Corcoran School of Art. He also earned an MFA in painting from Indiana University. His background in architecture stood him in good stead, however, for he worked extensively as an exhibit designer at the United States Department of State, the United States Information Agency, and the Smithsonian Institution. He also spent time teaching at the University of Minnesota. In addition to the commission by the Bureau of Reclamation, McAdams was commissioned by NASA to record the Mercury space program. He has twice won awards from the Washington Watercolor Association.

References

Biography

1914 births
2008 deaths
20th-century American painters
American male painters
George Washington University alumni
Indiana University alumni
University of Minnesota faculty
Artists from Louisville, Kentucky
Painters from Kentucky
School of the Art Institute of Chicago alumni
Corcoran School of the Arts and Design alumni